Tony McQuay (born April 16, 1990) is an American track and field athlete who specializes in the 400 meters.  He is a member of the 2012 and 2016 United States Olympic teams, winning a silver medal in the  relay in 2012 and a gold in the same event in 2016.  He is also a two time World Champion in this event.

Early years
McQuay was born in West Palm Beach, Florida.  He graduated from Suncoast Community High School in Riviera Beach, Florida, where he ran the 100 meters, 200 meters and 400 meters for the Suncoast Chargers track and field team.  He won the FHSAA state championship in the 400 meters as a senior.  He also played for the Suncoast Chargers high school football team, and was recognized as the team's most outstanding wide receiver, most improved defensive back, and best all-around player.

College career
McQuay attended the University of Florida in Gainesville, Florida, and was a member of coach Mike Holloway's Florida Gators track and field team in National Collegiate Athletic Association (NCAA) competition.  In the 400 meters, McQuay was the 2011 NCAA indoor champion, 2012 NCAA indoor champion, the 2012 outdoor champion, and a two-time Southeastern Conference (SEC) outdoor champion.  He won the senior open 400 meters event at the 2011 USA Outdoor Track and Field Championships with a time of 44.68 seconds, edging Olympic gold medalist Jeremy Wariner and world champion Greg Nixon.

2012 Olympics
McQuay finished second in the 400 meters at the U.S. Olympic Track and Field Trials in the 400 meters on June 24, 2012, qualifying him to run in the 400 meters and 4x400 relay at the 2012 Summer Olympics in London, England. He finished second in his heat at the London Olympics with a time of 45.48, qualifying him into the semi-finals where he was eliminated after placing fourth. In the 4 × 400 m, he ran the third leg of the race to help his team win silver behind the Bahamians.

2013 World Championships
Tony McQuay finished second in the 400 meters at the 2013 IAAF World Championships in Athletics in Moscow, Russia with a personal best time of 44.40 seconds.  He was also part of the US 4 x 400 metres team that won gold there.

2015 World Championships 
McQuay was part of the US team that won the gold medal at the 2015 World Championships in Beijing.

2016 Olympics
McQuay was a member of the U.S. 4 × 400 metres relay team that qualified for the finals with the second fastest time (2:58,38), coming behind Jamaica.  In the final, the United States became Olympic champions in a time of 2:57,30, with Jamaica second and Bahamas third. McQuay earned his second Olympic medal. McQuay's 400m race split was 43.5 as reported by announcer Ato Bolden.

2017 World Championships 
The United States team including McQuay, finished in second at the 2017 World Championships.

See also

Florida Gators
List of Olympic medalists in athletics (men)
List of University of Florida Olympians

References

1990 births
Living people
African-American male track and field athletes
American male sprinters
Athletes (track and field) at the 2012 Summer Olympics
Florida Gators men's track and field athletes
People from Riviera Beach, Florida
Olympic silver medalists for the United States in track and field
Medalists at the 2012 Summer Olympics
World Athletics Championships athletes for the United States
World Athletics Championships medalists
Sportspeople from the Miami metropolitan area
Olympic gold medalists for the United States in track and field
Athletes (track and field) at the 2016 Summer Olympics
Medalists at the 2016 Summer Olympics
Track and field athletes from Florida
USA Outdoor Track and Field Championships winners
World Athletics Championships winners
21st-century African-American sportspeople